Bu ol Kheyr Rural District is in Delvar District of Tangestan County, Bushehr province, Iran. At the census of 2006, its population was 9,707 in 2,287 households; there were 10,547 inhabitants in 2,761 households at the following census of 2011; and in the most recent census of 2016, the population of the rural district was 11,604 in 3,378 households. The largest of its 17 villages was Ameri, with 2,581 people.

References 

Rural Districts of Bushehr Province
Populated places in Tangestan County